Didrik Strömberg (born 16 March 1994) is a professional Swedish Ice Hockey player. He was born in Sundsvall, Sweden. Didrik currently plays for Timrå IK in the Swedish Hockey League (SHL). His youth team was IF Sundsvall Hockey.

References

External links

1994 births
Living people
HV71 players
Swedish ice hockey players
IF Sundsvall Hockey players
Timrå IK players
People from Sundsvall
Sportspeople from Västernorrland County